Ukraine participated in the Junior Eurovision Song Contest 2017 which will be held in Tbilisi, Georgia on 26 November 2017. Their entrant was selected through a national selection, organized by the Ukrainian broadcaster NTU. The semi-final took place on 8 August 2017, where the 27 eligible submissions performed in front of a jury, and then they chose ten artists to qualify to the final, which took place on 25 August 2017. As a result, Anastasiya Baginska won the Ukrainian selection and got the right to represent Ukraine in Tbilisi, Georgia with the song "Don't Stop (Ne zupyniay)".

Background

In 2016, Sofia Rol represented Ukraine in Valletta, Malta with the song "Planet Craves For Love". It ended 14th out of 17 competing countries with 30 points.

Before Junior Eurovision

National final 
The Ukrainian broadcaster launched their selection process on 7 July 2017, accepting submissions until 7 August 2017. A semi-final took place on 8 August 2017, with all the submissions performing in front of a professional jury consisting of Sofia Rol, Svitlana Tarabova, Valentyn Koval, ROZHDEN and Viktor Knysh, who decided the 10 acts that qualified for the final. It was announced shortly after the semi-final that the final would take place on 25 August 2017.

Final 
The final, hosted by Timur Miroshnychenko and Daria Kolomiiets, took place on 25 August 2017 in the International Children's Centre in Artek, based in Pushcha-Vodytsia. It consisted of 10 competing acts participating in a televised production where the winner was determined by a 50/50 combination of both telephone vote and the votes of a jury made up of music professionals. The show was opened by the 2016 Ukrainian representative Sofia Rol who performed her song "Planet Craves For Love". The jury, responsible for delivering 50% of the final result, consisted of: Vadym Lysytsia (music, sound producer), Iryna Shvaidak (singer), EL Kravchuk (singer, actor), Svitlana Tarabarova (singer, composer), ROZHDEN (singer, musician). Eventually, Anastasiya Baginska was announced as the winner of the national final and earned the right to represent Ukraine in Tbilisi, Georgia with the song "Ne zupyniay". The public televote in the final registered 14,731 votes in total.

Artist and song information

Anastasiya Baginska

Anastasiya Baginska (born 8 July 2005) is a Ukrainian child singer. She represented Ukraine at the Junior Eurovision Song Contest 2017 with the song "Don't stop (Ne zupyniay)"

Don't Stop
"Don't Stop", is a song by Ukrainian child singer Anastasiya Baginska. It represented Ukraine at the Junior Eurovision Song Contest 2017.

At Junior Eurovision
During the opening ceremony and the running order draw which will both take place on 20 November 2017, Ukraine was drawn to perform eleventh on 26 November 2017, following Albania and preceding Malta.

In Ukraine, the final will be broadcast on UA:Pershyi with commentary by Timur Miroshnychenko. The Ukrainian spokesperson, who will announce the top 12-point score awarded by the Ukrainian jury during the final, will be 2016 Ukrainian representative Sofia Rol.

Voting

Detailed voting results

References

Junior Eurovision Song Contest
Ukraine
2017